My Nikifor is a 2004 Polish drama film directed by Krzysztof Krauze. It is based on the life of Nikifor, a folk and naïve painter.

Cast
Krystyna Feldman as Nikifor
Roman Gancarczyk as Marian Włosiński
Lucyna Malec as Hanna Włosińska
Jerzy Gudejko as Ryszard Nowak
Artur Steranko as Doctor Rosen 
Jowita Miondlikowska as Cleaning Lady Kowalska 
Marian Dziędziel as Budnik

Release

In the United Kingdom, My Nikifor opened with a box office gross of only £7 upon its release in 2007, making it the lowest-grossing film release in British history.

Reception
Basing on 8 critics, My Nikifor holds an 88% rank on review aggregator website Rotten Tomatoes, with an average rating of 6/10.

Wally Hammond of Time Out gave the film 3 out of 5 and called acting as "solid".

In a review for Variety, Leslie Felperin wrote: "Though in most respects a conventional painter's biopic, My Nikifor has some interesting warps in its canvas".

According to Thomas Dawson of BBC, the film "is a spare yet affecting cinematic portrait".

Awards
2005 Crystal Globe at the 40th Karlovy Vary International Film Festival, where also Krauze won the Best Director Award for the film.
2005 Polish Film Awards for best actress, best cinematography, best sound, best editing and best production design
2005 Chicago International Film Festival (Gold Hugo)
2005 Polish Film Festival in America (Golden Teeth Award)

Bibliography
</ref>
</ref>

References

External links

2004 films
2004 drama films
Polish drama films
Biographical films about painters
2000s Polish-language films